Faust Brothers Building, also known as the Trading Post, is a historic retail building located at Baltimore, Maryland, United States. It is a five-story brick commercial building with a cast-iron façade above an altered storefront, erected about 1875. It is the only known example of cast-iron fronts on the front and back sides.

The Faust Brothers Building was listed on the National Register of Historic Places in 1994. It is included within the Baltimore National Heritage Area.

References

External links
, including photo from 1980, at Maryland Historical Trust

Cast-iron architecture in Baltimore
Commercial buildings on the National Register of Historic Places in Baltimore
Commercial buildings completed in 1875
Baltimore National Heritage Area
Downtown Baltimore